Augustin Billa is a Cameroonian footballer who plays as a midfielder for FC Jeunesse Canach in the Luxembourg Division of Honour.

Career
Billa was born on 25 August 1990, and began his career from the youth teams of Benfica. In 2009, he tried his luck in France with Rouen. He returned to Portugal in 2011 and had three successful seasons with Atlético Reguengos and  SC Mirandela. On 7 September 2014 he signed a 1-year contract with AE Larissa.

References

External links

Football.com Profile

1990 births
Living people
Cameroonian footballers
Athlitiki Enosi Larissa F.C. players
Association football midfielders
Association football forwards